The 2018–19 Providence Friars men's basketball team represented Providence College in the 2018–19 NCAA Division I men's basketball season. The Friars, led by eighth-year head coach Ed Cooley, played their home games at the Dunkin' Donuts Center as members of the Big East Conference. They finished the season 18–16, 7–11 in Big East play to finish in a three-way tie for last place. As the No. 8 seed in the Big East tournament, they defeated Butler before losing to Villanova in the quarterfinals. They received an at-large bid to the NIT where they lost in the first round to Arkansas.

Previous season
The Friars finished the 2017–18 season 21–14, 10–8 in Big East play to finish in a three-way tie for third place. As the No. 5 seed in the Big East tournament, they defeated Creighton and No. 1-seeded Xavier in back-to-back overtime games to advance to the championship game. In a third straight overtime game, the Friars fell to Villanova in the championship game. They received an at-large bid to the NCAA tournament as the No. 10 seed in the West region where they lost to Texas A&M in the first round.

Offseason

Departures

2018 recruiting class

2019 recruiting class

Preseason

Roster

Schedule and results

|-
!colspan=9 style=| Exhibition

|-
!colspan=9 style=| Non-conference regular season

|-
!colspan=9 style=| Big East regular season

|-
!colspan=9 style=| Big East tournament

|-
!colspan=9 style=| NIT

References

Providence
Providence Friars men's basketball seasons
Providence
Providence
Providence